Isog (possibly from Quechua isu skin sickness caused by a certain mite (mange), -q a suffix) is an archaeological site in Peru. It is situated in the Huánuco Region, Huamalíes Province, Tantamayo District. The site was declared a National Cultural Heritage by Resolución Directoral No. 533/INC on June 18, 2002.

Isog lies on the northern slope of the mountain Susupillo which is also the name of the archaeological site south of Isog.

See also 
 Anku
 Piruro
Huankarán

References 

Archaeological sites in Huánuco Region
Archaeological sites in Peru